3-Aminophenol is an organic compound with formula C6H4(NH2)(OH). It is an aromatic amine and aromatic alcohol. It is the meta isomer of 2-aminophenol and 4-aminophenol.

Preparation
3-Aminophenol can be prepared by caustic fusion of 3-aminobenzenesulfonic acid (i.e. heating with NaOH to 245 °C for 6 hours) or from resorcinol via a substitution reaction with ammonium hydroxide.

Uses
One of the most relevant applications of the substance is the synthesis of 3-(diethylamino)phenol, key intermediate for the preparation of several fluorescent dyes (e.g., rhodamine B). Other uses for the compound include hair dye colorants and stabilizers for chlorine-containing thermoplastics.

References 

Aminophenols